Chinese-United Kingdom relations, more commonly known as British–Chinese relations, Anglo-Chinese relations and Sino-British relations, are the interstate relations between China (with its various governments through history) and the United Kingdom.

Relations between the two nations have gone through ups and downs over the course of the late 20th and early 21st centuries. The UK and China were on opposing sides during the Cold War, and relations were strained during the period Hong Kong was a British territory. Following the conclusion of the Cold War and the completion of an agreement regarding Hong Kong's future, a period known as the "Golden Era" of Sino-British relations began with multiple high-level state visits and bilateral trade and military agreements. This roughly 20-year period came to an abrupt end during the 2019–2020 Hong Kong democracy protests and the imposition of a highly controversial national security law that quelled civil liberties and freedoms in the city, which was viewed in the UK as a serious breach of the Sino-British Joint Declaration. In the years following relations have deteriorated significantly, with the UK banning Chinese companies from its 5G network development, participating in Anglo-American military operations in the South China Sea to counter Chinese territorial claims, and sanctioning China for confirmed human rights abuses and crimes against humanity in Xinjiang. However, despite this, the countries maintain close economic relations, with China being UK's third-largest trading partner as of 2022.

Chronology

Medieval
Rabban Bar Sauma from China visited France and met with King Edward I of England in Gascony.

Between England and the Ming Dynasty (1368–1644)

English ships sailed to Macau in the 1620s, which was leased by China to Portugal. The Unicorn, an English merchant ship, sank near Macau and the Portuguese dredged up sakers (cannon) from the ships and sold those to China around 1620, where they were reproduced as Hongyipao.
27 June 1637: Four heavily armed ships under Captain John Weddell, arrived at Macao in an attempt to open trade between England and China. They were not backed by the East India Company, but rather by a private group led by Sir William Courten, including King Charles I's personal interest of £10,000. They were opposed by the Portuguese authorities in Macao (as their agreements with China required) and quickly infuriated the Ming authorities. Later, in the summer, they captured one of the Bogue forts, and spent several weeks engaged in low-level fighting and smuggling. After being forced to seek Portuguese help in the release of three hostages, they left the Pearl River on 27 December. It is unclear whether they returned home.

Great Britain and the Qing Dynasty (1644–1911)

1685 Michael Shen Fu-Tsung visits Britain and meets the king.
1784 The Lady Hughes Affair leads to the execution of a British gunner for firing a salute that caused the death of two Chinese.
1793 George Macartney, 1st Earl Macartney led the Macartney Embassy to Peking (Beijing)
1816 William Pitt Amherst, 1st Earl Amherst led the Amherst Embassy to China.
ca. 1820–1830 – British merchants turn Lintin Island in the Pearl River estuary into a centre of opium trade.

 1833-35 As London ended the East India Company's monopoly on trade with China, both Tory and Whig governments sought to maintain peace and good trade relations. However Baron Napier wanted to provoke a revolution in China that would open trade. The Foreign Office, led by Lord Palmerston, stood opposed and sought peace.
1839–42 First Opium War, a decisive British victory. British goal was to enforce diplomatic equality and respect. The dominant British position was reflected by the biographer of the foreign minister Lord Palmerston: 
Conflict between China and Britain was inevitable. On the one side was a corrupt, decadent and caste-ridden despotism, with no desire or ability to wage war, which relied on custom much more than force for the enforcement of extreme privilege and discrimination, and which was blinded by a deep-rooted superiority complex into believing that they could assert their supremacy over Europeans without possessing military power. On the other side was the most economically advanced nation in the world, a nation of pushing, bustling traders, of self-help, free trade, and the pugnacious qualities of John Bull.

An entirely opposite British viewpoint was promoted by humanitarians and reformers such as the Chartists and religious nonconformists led by young William Ewart Gladstone. They argued  that Palmerston was only interested in the huge profits it would bring Britain, and was totally oblivious to the horrible moral evils of opium which the Chinese government was valiantly trying to stamp out.
 
 1841 – Convention of Chuenpi, intended to end the war and to cede Hong Kong Island to the British, signed, but never ratified
 29 August 1842 – Treaty of Nanking ends the war. It includes the cession of  Hong Kong Island to the British, and opening of five treaty ports to international trade
 October 1843 – Treaty of the Bogue supplements  Treaty of Nanking by granting extraterritoriality to British subjects in China and most favoured nation status to Britain
1845–1863 – British Concession in Shanghai established, with the Shanghai International Settlement (1863–1943) replacing the concession soon after.  
1856–60 Second Opium War
 June 1858 – The Treaty of Tientsin is signed by Lord Elgin
October 1860 – the sack and destruction of the Old Summer Palace by the victorious British and French troops
October 1860 – Convention of Peking ends the war. Kowloon Peninsula is ceded to Britain
26 March 1861 – In accordance with the treaties, a British legation opens in Beijing (Peking). In the following few years consulates open throughout the Empire, including Hankou (Wuhan), Takao (Kaohsiung), Tamsui (near Taipei), Shanghai and Xiamen.
1868 – The Yangzhou riot against Christian missionaries.

1870–1900 The telegraph system operated by Britain linked London and the main port cities of China.
1875 – The Margary Affair.
1877 – A Chinese Legation opens in London under Guo Songtao (Kuo Sung-t'ao)
1877–1881 – Britain advises on the Ili Crisis.
1886 – After Britain took over Burma, they maintained the sending of tribute to China, putting themselves in a lower status than in their previous relations. It was agreed in the Burma Convention in 1886, that China would recognise Britain's occupation of Upper Burma while Britain continued the Burmese payment of tribute every ten years to Beijing.
1888 - War in Sikkim between the British and Tibetans. By the Treaty of Calcutta (1890), China recognises British suzerainty over northern Sikkim.
 17 March 1890 Convention Between Great Britain and China relating to Sikkim & Tibet, fixes the border between Sikkim and Tibet.
1896 – Sun Yat-sen is detained in the Chinese Legation in London. Under pressure from the British public, the Foreign Office secures his release.
 9 June 1898 – Convention for the Extension of Hong Kong Territory (Second Convention of Peking): New Territories are leased to Britain for 99 years, and are incorporated in Hong Kong
1898 – The British obtain a lease on Weihai Harbour, Shandong, to run for as long as the Russians lease Port Arthur. (The reference to the Russians was replaced with one to the Japanese after 1905). An incident occurred where Mail-steamers arrived in Shanghai and dropped off "four young English girls" in December 1898.
1900–1901 – The Boxer Rebellion; attacks on foreign missionaries and converts; repressed by Allied counterforce led by Britain and Japan.
1901 – The Boxer Protocol
1906 – Anglo-Chinese Treaty on Tibet, which London interprets as limiting China to suzerainty over the region
1909 – The Japanese Government claims foreign consulates in Taiwan; the British consulates at Tamsui and Takoa close the following year.

Britain and the Republic of China (1912–present)

1916 – The Chinese Labour Corps recruits Chinese labourers to aid the British during World War I.
14 August 1917 – China joins Britain as part of the Allies of World War I.
4 May 1919 – The anti-imperialist May Fourth Movement begins in response to the Beiyang government's failure to secure a share of the victory spoils from the leading Allied Powers, after Britain sides with its treaty ally Japan on the Shandong Problem. From this point the ROC leadership moves away from Western models and towards the Soviet Union.
 November 1921 – February 1922. At the  Washington naval disarmament conference rivalries persisted over China. The Nine-Power Treaty officially recognized Chinese sovereignty. Japan returned control of Shandong province, of the Shandong Problem, to China. 
 1922-1929: The United States, Japan and Britain supported different warlords. The US and Britain were hostile to the nationalists revolutionary government in Guangzhou (Canton) and supported Chen Jiongming's rebellion. Chinese reactions led to the Northern Expedition (1926–27) which finally unified China under Chiang Kai-shek. 
30 May 1925 – Shanghai Municipal Police officers under British leadership kill nine people while trying to defend a police station from Chinese protesters, provoking the anti-British campaign known as the May 30 Movement.
19 February 1927 – Following riots on the streets of Hankow (Wuhan), the Chen-O'Malley Agreement is entered into providing for the hand over of the British Concession area to the Chinese authorities.
 1929–1931. The key to Chinese sovereignty was to gain control of tariff rates, which Western powers had set at a low 5%, and to end the extraterritoriality by which Britain and the others controlled Shanghai and other treaty ports. These goals were finally achieved in 1928–1931.
1930 – Weihai Harbour returned to China.
17 May 1935 – Following decades of Chinese complaints about the low rank of Western diplomats, the British Legation in Beijing is upgraded to an Embassy.
1936–37 – British Embassy moves to Nanjing (Nanking), following the earlier transfer there of the Chinese capital.

1937–41 –  British public and official opinion favours China in its war against Japan, but Britain focuses on defending Singapore and the Empire and can give little help.  It does provide training in India for Chinese infantry divisions, and air bases in India used by the Americans to fly supplies and warplanes to China.

1941–45 – Chinese and British fight side by side against Japan in World War II.  The British train Chinese troops in India and use them in the Burma campaign.
6 January 1950 – His Majesty's Government (HMG) removes recognition from the Republic of China. The Nanjing Embassy is then wound down. The Tamsui Consulate is kept open under the guise of liaison with the Taiwan Provincial Government.
13 March 1972 – The Tamsui Consulate is closed.
February 1976 – The Anglo Taiwan Trade Committee is formed to promote trade between Britain and Taiwan.
30 June 1980 – Fort San Domingo is seized by the Republic of China authorities in lieu of unpaid rent.
1989 – The Anglo Taiwan Trade Committee begins issuing British visas in Taipei.
1993 – British Trade and Cultural Office opened in Taipei.
October 2020 – Taiwan (ROC) donates a number of medical masks to the United Kingdom to help fight the COVID-19 pandemic. Donated masks were transferred to the NHS for distribution. The masks are among 7 million donated to European countries.

Between the UK and the People's Republic of China (1949–present)

The United Kingdom and the anti-Communist Nationalist Chinese government were allies during World War II. Britain sought stability in China after the war to protect its more than £300 million in investments, much more than from the United States. It agreed in the Moscow Agreement of 1945 to not interfere in Chinese affairs but sympathised with the Nationalists, who until 1947 were winning the Chinese Civil War against the Chinese Communist Party (CCP).

By August 1948, however, the Communists' victories caused the British government to begin preparing for a Communist takeover of the country. It kept open consulates in CCP-controlled areas and rejected the Nationalists' requests that British citizens assist in the defence of Shanghai. By December, the government concluded that although British property in China would likely be nationalised, British traders would benefit in the long run from a stable, industrialising Communist China. Retaining Hong Kong was especially important; although the CCP promised to not interfere with its rule, Britain reinforced the Hong Kong Garrison during 1949. When the victorious Communist government declared on 1 October 1949 that it would exchange diplomats with any country that ended relations with the Nationalists, Britain—after discussions with other Commonwealth members and European countries—formally recognised the People's Republic of China in January 1950.

20 April 1949 - The People's Liberation Army attacks  travelling to the British Embassy in Nanjing in the Amethyst incident. The CCP do not recognise the Unequal treaties and protest the ship's right to sail on the Yangtze.
6 January 1950 – The United Kingdom recognises the PRC as the government of China and posts a chargé d'affaires ad interim in Beijing (Peking). The British expect a rapid exchange of Ambassadors.  However, the PRC demands concessions on the Chinese seat at the UN and the foreign assets of the Republic of China.
c.1950 – British companies seeking trade with the PRC form the Group of 48 (now  China-Britain Business Council). 
1950 – British Commonwealth Forces in Korea successfully defend Hill 282 against Chinese and North Korean forces in the Battle of Pakchon, part of the Korean War.
1950 – The Chinese People's Volunteer Army defeat U.N forces, including the British at the Battle of Chosin Reservoir, part of the Korean War
1951 – Chinese forces clash with U.N forces including the British at the Imjin River.
1951 – Chinese forces attacking outnumbered British Commonwealth forces are held back in the Battle of Kapyong.
1951 – British Commonwealth forces successfully capture Hill 317 from Chinese forces in the Battle of Maryang San.
1953 – Outnumbered British forces successfully defend Yong Dong against Chinese forces in the Battle of the Hook.
1954 – The Sino-British Trade Committee formed as semi-official trade body (later merged with the Group of 48).
1954 – A British Labour Party delegation including Clement Attlee visits China at the invitation of then Foreign Minister Zhou Enlai.  Attlee became the first high-ranking western politician to meet Mao Zedong.
17 June 1954 – Following talks at the Geneva Conference, the PRC agrees to station a chargé d'affaires in London. The same talks resulted in an agreement to  re-open a British office in Shanghai, and the grant of exit visas to several British businessmen confined to the mainland since 1951.
1961 – The UK begins to vote in the General Assembly for PRC membership of the United Nations. It had abstained on votes since 1950.
June 1967 – Red Guards break into the British Legation in Beijing and assault three diplomats and a secretary. The PRC authorities refuse to condemn the action. British officials in Shanghai were attacked in a separate incident, as the PRC authorities attempted to close the office there.
June–August 1967 – Hong Kong 1967 riots. The commander of  the Guangzhou Military Region, Huang Yongsheng, secretly suggests invading Hong Kong, but  his plan is vetoed by Zhou Enlai.
July 1967 – Hong Kong 1967 riots – Chinese People's Liberation Army troops fire on British Hong Kong Police, killing 5 of them.
23 August 1967 – A Red Guard mob sacks the British Legation in Beijing, slightly injuring the chargé d'affaires Sir Donald Hopson and other staff including Percy Cradock, in response to British arrests of CCP agents in Hong Kong. A Reuters correspondent, Anthony Grey, was also imprisoned by the PRC authorities.
29 August 1967 – Armed Chinese diplomats attack British police guarding the Chinese Legation in London.
13 March 1972 – PRC accords full recognition to the UK government, permitting the exchange of ambassadors. The UK acknowledges the PRC's position on Taiwan without accepting it.
1982 – During negotiations with Margaret Thatcher about the return of Hong Kong, Deng Xiaoping  tells her that China can simply invade Hong Kong. It is revealed later (2007) that such plans indeed existed.
1984 – Sino-British Joint Declaration.
12–18 October 1986 – Queen Elizabeth II makes a state visit to the PRC, becoming the first British monarch to visit China.
30 June-1 July 1997 – Transfer of sovereignty over Hong Kong from United Kingdom to China.
1997 – China and Britain forge a strategic partnership.
24 August 2008 – Olympic flag is handed over from the Beijing mayor Guo Jinlong to London mayor Boris Johnson, for the 2012 Summer Olympics in London.
29 October 2008 – The UK recognises Tibet as an integral part of the PRC. It had previously only recognised Chinese suzerainty over the region.
26 June 2010 – China's paramount leader Hu Jintao invites British Prime Minister David Cameron for talks in Beijing.
5 July 2010 – Both countries pledge closer military cooperation.
25 November 2010 – Senior military officials meet in Beijing to discuss military cooperation.
26 June 2011 – Chinese Premier Wen Jiabao visits London in order to plan out trade between the two countries which is worth billions of pounds.
 October 2013 – Britain's chancellor George Osborne visits China to look at making new trade links. He says that the UK and China have "much in common" in a speech during his visit.
 June 2014 – Chinese Premier Li Keqiang and his wife Cheng Hong visit UK and meet with Queen Elizabeth II and British Prime Minister David Cameron.
 2015 – UK becomes one of the founder members of the Chinese-led Asian Infrastructure Investment Bank (AIIB) 
20–23 October 2015 – China's paramount leader Xi Jinping and First Lady Peng Liyuan undertake a state visit to the United Kingdom, visiting London and Manchester, and meeting with Queen Elizabeth II and David Cameron. More than £30 billion worth of trade deals are also signed on this state visit.
July 2016 – China and the UK start a £1.3 million collaboration project on sustainable agricultural technology research, marking the latest addition to farming cooperation between the two countries.
March 2017 – To mark the occasion of the 45th anniversary of the establishment of diplomatic relations, China Plus, together with Renmin University, invites experts and researchers from China and the UK to discuss the future of bilateral relations.
February 2018 – British Prime Minister Theresa May visits China on a three-day trade mission and meets with China's paramount leader Xi Jinping, continuing the so-called "Golden Era" of China-British relations.
July 2019 – The UN ambassadors from 22 nations, including UK, signed a joint letter to the UNHRC condemning China's mistreatment of the Uyghurs as well as its mistreatment of other minority groups, urging the Chinese government to close the Xinjiang re-education camps.
June 2020 – The United Kingdom openly opposed the Hong Kong national security law. Lord Patten, who oversaw the handover as governor, said the security law put an end to the "one country, two systems" principle and was a flagrant breach of the agreement between Britain and China.
1 July 2020 – British Prime Minister Boris Johnson told the Commons "The enactment and imposition of this National Security law constitutes a clear and serious breach of the Sino-British joint declaration". The British Government pledged to provide three million Hong Kongers holding British National (Overseas) passport a path to full British citizenship.
6 July 2020 – China's Ambassador to the United Kingdom Liu Xiaoming said the United Kingdom will "bear the consequences” if it treats China as a “hostile” country in deciding whether to allow telecoms equipment maker Huawei a role in UK 5G phone networks.
On 20 July 2020, UK government decided to suspend the extradition treaty with China, over the treatment of the Uyghur minority in Xinjiang.
On 15 August 2020, the UK government suspended its military training with Hong Kong police amid worsening relations with China. Officials from the United Kingdom said the decision was being implemented because of COVID-19 pandemic. However, an MoD spokesperson confirmed that the contracts will be reviewed when the pandemic is over.
From 1 October 2020, the Foreign, Commonwealth and Development Office of the British Government expanded the remit of its security vetting for overseas applicants wanting to study subjects relating to national security. The Times said in a report that “The measures are expected to block hundreds of Chinese students from entering Britain. Visas for those already enrolled will be revoked if they are deemed to pose a risk.” 
On 6 October 2020, Germany's ambassador to the UN, on behalf of the group of 39 countries including Germany, the U.K. and the U.S., made a statement to denounce China for its treatment of ethnic minorities and for curtailing freedoms in Hong Kong.
On 7 October 2020, the UK Parliament's Defence Committee released a report claiming that there was clear evidence of collusion between Huawei and Chinese state and the CCP. The UK Parliament's Defence Committee said that the government should consider removal of all Huawei equipment from its 5G networks earlier than planned.
On 12 October, the UK began to consider sanctions on China over the breach of Hong Kong by implementing the National Security Law.
On 22 March 2021, the UK, EU, US and Canada together imposed sanctions on senior Chinese officials involved with the mass detention of Uighur Muslims in Xinjiang province.  This marked the first time the UK and EU had sanctioned China since 1989.
On 25 March, China sanctioned ten UK individuals, including former Conservative Party leader Iain Duncan Smith in retaliation for the sanctions on Chinese officials over Xinjiang.
On 23 April, MP's led by Sir Iain Duncan Smith passed a motion declaring the mass detention of Uighur Muslims in Xinjiang province a genocide. The United Kingdom is the fourth country in the world to make such action. In response, the Chinese Embassy in London said "The unwarranted accusation by a handful of British MPs that there is 'genocide' in Xinjiang is the most preposterous lie of the century, an outrageous insult and affront to the Chinese people, and a gross breach of international law and the basic norms governing international relations. China strongly opposes the UK's blatant interference in China's internal affairs."
On 25 April 2021, the China Research Group of Conservative MPs is founded.
 On 1 August 2021 the Embassy of China, London criticized the BBC's coverage of the 2020 Summer Olympics, particularly its Taiwan related coverage. The embassy also condemned a News.com.au article cited by the BBC. The statement said that “The reports on the BBC Chinese website and news.com.au about the participation of ‘Chinese Taipei’ in Tokyo Olympics are unprofessional and severely misleading. The Chinese side is gravely concerned and strongly opposes this.” On 4 August the embassy again criticized the BBC’s coverage of Taiwan’s participation in the Olympics saying that a BBC article explaining the history of Taiwan’s Olympic moniker “Chinese Taipei” had been "sensationalizing the question of the 'Chinese Taipei' team at the Tokyo Olympics.” and went on to state "[China] strongly urges these media to follow international consensus and professional conduct, to stop politicizing sports, and to stop interference with the Tokyo Olympic games."
 In 2021, China reiterated its support for Argentina's claim to the Falkland Islands. On 7 February 2022, Liz Truss called on China to respect the sovereignty of the Falkland Islands.
 On 16 October 2022 Chinese consulate personnel in the UK allegedly dragged a pro-democracy protestor onto consulate grounds and then beat him. Six officials who were involved, including the consul-general of the Manchester Consulate, Zheng Xiyuan,  were recalled back to China in December.
 On 18 October 2022, it was reported that up to 30 former British military pilots had gone to China to train Chinese military pilots for money. Whilst this does not break any UK laws, the UK Ministry of Defence announced that it was taking immediate steps to deter and penalise the activity, which it said "erodes the UK's defence advantage".
 On 28 November 2022, Rishi Sunak, the UK's prime minister has signalled the last days of the “golden era” of relations between China and Britain, using his first main overseas policy talk to alert of the creeping authoritarianism of Xi Jinping's government, and the threat it poses to British values. However, he stopped short of describing China as a threat, and said that China's influence in global affairs cannot be overlooked. He also said that diplomacy and engagement were necessary as well.

Diplomacy 

Of United Kingdom
 Beijing (Embassy)
 Chongqing (Consulate General)
 Guangzhou (Consulate General)
 Hong Kong (Consulate General)
 Shanghai (Consulate General)
 Wuhan (Consulate General)

Of China
 London (Embassy)
 Manchester (Consulate General)
 Edinburgh (Consulate General)
 Belfast (Consulate General)

Common memberships

Transport

Air Transport 
All three major Chinese airlines, Air China, China Eastern & China Southern fly between the UK and China, principally between London-Heathrow and the three major air hubs of Beijing, Shanghai and Guangzhou. China Southern also flies between Heathrow and Wuhan. Among China's other airlines; Hainan Airlines flies between Manchester and Beijing, Beijing Capital Airlines offers Heathrow to Qingdao, while Tianjin Airlines offers flights between Tianjin, Chongqing and Xi'an to London-Gatwick. Hong Kong's flag carrier Cathay Pacific also flies between Hong Kong to Heathrow, Gatwick and Manchester. The British flag carrier British Airways flies to just three destinations in China; Beijing, Shanghai and Hong Kong, and in the past Chengdu. Rival Virgin Atlantic flies between Heathrow to Shanghai and Hong Kong.  British Airways has mentioned that it is interested in leasing China's new Comac C919 in its pool of aircraft of Boeing and Airbus.

Rail Transport 
In January 2017, China Railways and DB Cargo launched the Yiwu-London Railway Line connecting the city of Yiwu and the London borough of Barking, and creating the longest railway freight line in the world. Hong Kong's MTR runs the London's TfL Rail service and has a 30% stake in South Western Railway. In 2017, train manufacturer CRRC won a contract to build 71 engineering wagons for London Underground. This is the first time a Chinese manufacturer has won a railway contract.

Press 
The weekly-published Europe edition of China Daily is available in a few newsagents in the UK, and on occasions a condensed version called China Watch is published in the Daily Telegraph. The monthly NewsChina, the North American English-language edition of China Newsweek (中国新闻周刊) is available in a few branches of WHSmith. Due to local censorship, British newspapers and magazines are not widely available in Mainland China, however the Economist and Financial Times are available in Hong Kong.

British "China Hands" like Carrie Gracie, Isabel Hilton and Martin Jacques occasionally write opinion pieces in many British newspapers and political magazines about China, often to try and explain about Middle Kingdom.

Radio and television 
Like the press, China has a limited scope in the broadcasting arena. In radio, the international broadcaster China Radio International broadcasts in English over shortwave which isn't widely taken up and also on the internet. The BBC World Service is available in China by shortwave as well, although it is often jammed (See Radio jamming in China). In Hong Kong, the BBC World Service is relayed for eight hours overnight on RTHK Radio 4 which on a domestic FM broadcast.

On television, China broadcasts both its two main English-language news channels CGTN and CNC World. CGTN is available as a streaming channel on Freeview, while both are available on Sky satellite TV and IPTV channels. Mandarin-speaking Phoenix CNE TV is also available of Sky satellite TV. Other TV channels such as CCTV-4, CCTV-13, CGTN Documentary and TVB Europe are available as IPTV channels using set-top boxes.

British television isn't available in China at all, as foreign televisions channels and networks are not allowed to be broadcast in China. On the other hand, there is an interest in British television shows such as Sherlock and British television formats like Britain's Got Talent (China's Got Talent (中国达人秀)) and Pop Idol (Super Girl (超级女声)).

British in China

Statesmen
 Sir Robert Hart was a Scots-Irish statesman who served the Chinese Imperial Government as Inspector General of Maritime Customs from 1863 to 1907.
 George Ernest Morrison resident correspondent of The Times, London, at Peking in 1897, and political adviser to the President of China from 1912 to 1920.

Diplomats

 Sir Thomas Wade – first professor of Chinese at Cambridge University
 Herbert Giles – second professor of Chinese at Cambridge University
 Harry Parkes
 Sir Claude MacDonald
 Sir Ernest Satow served as Minister in China, 1900–06.
 John Newell Jordan followed Satow
 Sir Christopher Hum
 Augustus Raymond Margary

Merchants
 Lancelot Dent
 Keswick family
 William Jardine

Military
Charles George Gordon

Missionaries
Robert Morrison
Hudson Taylor
Griffith John
Cambridge Seven
Eric Liddell
Gladys Aylward

Academics
Frederick W. Baller
James Legge (first professor of Chinese at the University of Oxford)
Joseph Needham
Jonathan Spence

Chinese statesmen
Li Hongzhang
Zhang Zhidong

See also

Foreign relations of the United Kingdom
 History of foreign relations of China
China Policy Institute
University of Nottingham Ningbo China
 Foreign relations of China
Foreign relations of imperial China
 Foreign relations of Hong Kong
 Foreign relations of Macau
 Foreign relations of Taiwan
British Chinese (Chinese people in the UK)
Sustainable Agriculture Innovation Network (between the UK and China)

References

Bibliography
 Bickers, Robert A. Britain in China: Community, Culture and Colonialism, 1900-49 (1999)
 Brunero, Donna. Britain's Imperial Cornerstone in China: The Chinese Maritime Customs Service, 1854–1949 (Routledge, 2006). Online review
 Carroll, John M. Edge of empires: Chinese elites and British colonials in Hong Kong (Harvard UP, 2009.)
 Cooper, Timothy S. "Anglo-Saxons and Orientals: British-American interaction over East Asia, 1898–1914." (PhD dissertation U of Edinburgh,  2017). online
 Cox, Howard, and Kai Yiu Chan. "The changing nature of Sino-foreign business relationships, 1842–1941." Asia Pacific Business Review (2000) 7#2 pp: 93–110. online
 
 Dean, Britten. China and Great Britain: The Diplomacy of Commercial Relations, 1860–1864 (1974)
 Fairbank, John King. Trade and diplomacy on the China coast: The opening of the treaty ports, 1842-1854 (Harvard UP, 1953), a major scholarly study; online
 Gerson, J.J. Horatio Nelson Lay and Sino-British relations. (Harvard University Press, 1972)
 Gregory, Jack S. Great Britain and the Taipings (1969) online
 Gull E. M. British Economic Interests In The Far East (1943) online
 Hanes, William Travis, and Frank Sanello. The opium wars: the addiction of one empire and the corruption of another (2002)
 Hinsley, F.H. ed. British Foreign Policy under Sir Edward Grey (Cambridge UP, 1977) ch 19, 21, 27, covers 1905 to 1916..
 Horesh, Niv. Shanghai's bund and beyond: British banks, banknote issuance, and monetary policy in China, 1842–1937 (Yale UP, 2009)
 Keay, John. The Honourable Company: a history of the English East India Company (1993)
 Kirby, William C. "The Internationalization of China: Foreign Relations at home and abroad in the Republican Era." The China Quarterly 150 (1997): 433–458. online
 Le Fevour, Edward. Western enterprise in late Ch'ing China: A selective survey of Jardine, Matheson and Company's operations, 1842–1895 (East Asian Research Center, Harvard University, 1968)
 Lodwick, Kathleen L. Crusaders against opium: Protestant missionaries in China, 1874–1917 (UP Kentucky, 1996)
 Louis, Wm Roger. British strategy in the Far East, 1919-1939 (1971) online
 McCordock, Stanley. British Far Eastern Policy 1894–1900 (1931) online
 Melancon, Glenn. "Peaceful intentions: the first British trade commission in China, 1833–5." Historical Research 73.180 (2000): 33–47.
 Melancon, Glenn. Britain's China Policy and the Opium Crisis: Balancing Drugs, Violence and National Honour, 1833–1840 (2003)  excerpt and text search
 Murfett, Malcolm H. "An Old Fashioned Form of Protectionism: The Role Played by British Naval Power in China from 1860–1941." American Neptune 50.3 (1990): 178–191.
 Porter, Andrew,  ed. The Oxford history of the British Empire: The nineteenth century. Vol. 3 (1999) pp 146–169. online
 Ridley,  Jasper. Lord Palmerston (1970) pp 242–260, 454–470; online
 Spence, Jonathan. "Western Perceptions of China from the Late Sixteenth Century to the Present" in Paul S. Ropp, ed. Heritage of China: Contemporary Perspectives on Chinese Civilization (1990) excerpts
 Suzuki, Yu. Britain, Japan and China, 1876–1895: East Asian International Relations before the First Sino–Japanese War (Routledge, 2020).
 Swan, David M. "British Cotton Mills in Pre-Second World War China." Textile History (2001) 32#2 pp: 175–216.
 Wang, Gungwu. Anglo-Chinese Encounters since 1800: War, Trade, Science, and Governance  (Cambridge University Press, 2003) 
 Woodcock, George. The British in the Far East (1969) online
 Yen-p’ing, Hao.  The Commercial Revolution in Nineteenth- Century China: the rise of Sino-Western Mercantile Capitalism (1986)

Since 1931
 Albers, Martin, ed. Britain, France, West Germany and the People's Republic of China, 1969–1982 (2016) online
 Barnouin, Barbara, and Yu Changgen. Chinese Foreign Policy during the Cultural Revolution (1998).
 Bickers, Robert. Britain in China: Community, Culture and Colonialism, 1900–49 (1999)
 Boardman, Robert.  Britain and the People's Republic of China, 1949–1974 (1976) online
 Breslin, Shaun. "Beyond diplomacy? UK relations with China since 1997." British Journal of Politics & International Relations 6#3 (2004): 409–425.0
 Brown, Kerry. What's Wrong With Diplomacy?: The Future of Diplomacy and the Case of China and the UK  (Penguin, 2015) 
 Buchanan, Tom. East Wind: China and the British Left, 1925–1976 (Oxford UP, 2012).
 Clayton, David. Imperialism Revisited: Political and Economic Relations between Britain and China, 1950–54 (1997)
 Clifford, Nicholas R. Retreat from China: British policy in the Far East, 1937-1941 (1967) online
 Feis, Herbert. The China Tangle (1967), diplomacy during World War II; online free to borrow
 Friedman, I.S. British Relations with China: 1931–1939 (1940) online
 Garver, John W. Foreign relations of the People's Republic of China (1992) online
 Kaufman, Victor S. "Confronting Communism: U.S. and British Policies toward China (2001) * Keith, Ronald C.  The Diplomacy of Zhou Enlai  (1989)
 MacDonald, Callum. Britain and the Korean War (1990)
 Mark, Chi-Kwan. The Everyday Cold War: Britain and China, 1950–1972 (2017) online review
 Martin, Edwin W. Divided Counsel: The Anglo-American Response to Communist Victory in China (1986)
 Osterhammel, Jürgen. "British business in China, 1860s–1950s." in British Business in Asia since 1860 (1989): 189–216. online
 Ovendale, Ritchie."Britain, the United States, and the Recognition of Communist China." Historical Journal  (1983) 26#1 pp 139–58.
 Porter, Brian Ernest. Britain and the rise of communist China: a study of British attitudes, 1945–1954 (Oxford UP, 1967).
 Rath, Kayte. "The Challenge of China: Testing Times for New Labour’s ‘Ethical Dimension." International Public Policy Review 2#1 (2006): 26–63.
 Roberts, Priscilla, and Odd Arne Westad, eds. China, Hong Kong, and the Long 1970s: Global Perspectives (2017) excerpt
 Shai, Aron. Britain and China, 1941–47 (1999) online.
 Shai, Aron. "Imperialism Imprisoned: the closure of British firms in the People's Republic of China." English Historical Review 104#410 (1989): 88–109 online.
 Silverman, Peter Guy. "British naval strategy in the Far East, 1919-1942 : a study of priorities in the question of imperial defense" (PhD dissertation U of Toronto, 1976) online
 Tang, James Tuck-Hong. Britain's Encounter with Revolutionary China, 1949—54 (1992)
 Tang, James TH. "From empire defence to imperial retreat: Britain's postwar China policy and the decolonization of Hong Kong." Modern Asian Studies 28.2 (1994): 317–337.
 Thorne, Christopher G. The limits of foreign policy; the West, the League, and the Far Eastern crisis of 1931-1933 (1972) online
 Trotter, Ann. Britain and East Asia 1933–1937 (1975) online.
 Wolf, David C. "`To Secure a Convenience': Britain Recognizes China— 1950." Journal of Contemporary History 18 (April 1983): 299–326. online
 Xiang, Lanxin. Recasting the imperial Far East : Britain and America in China, 1945-1950 (1995) online

Primary sources
 Lin Zexu, Deng Tingzhen 鄧廷楨 (1839) ["Letter to the Queen of England from the imperial commissioner and the provincial authorities requiring the interdiction of opium"], translation published in The Chinese Repository volume 8, number 1, May 1839, p. 9; also available at HathiTrust; an image of the original letter is also available
 Ruxton, Ian (ed.), The Diaries of Sir Ernest Satow, British Envoy in Peking (1900–06)'' in two volumes, Lulu Press Inc., April 2006  (Volume One);  (Volume Two)fu

External links

 Backgrounder: Sino-British Relations
 Embassy of the People's Republic of China in the United Kingdom of Great Britain and Northern Ireland
 Embassy of the United Kingdom of Great Britain and Northern Ireland in the People's Republic of China

 
United Kingdom
Bilateral relations of the United Kingdom